Kate Henshaw, also known as Kate Henshaw-Nuttall (born 19 July 1971), is a Nigerian actress. In 2008 she won the Africa Movie Academy Award for Best Actress in a Leading Role for her performance in the movie Stronger than Pain.

Early life
Kate Henshaw was born in Cross River State, the oldest of four children. She attended St. Mary private school in Ajele, Lagos for her primary education. Later, she was admitted to the Federal Government Girl College, Calabar for her secondary school education. She spent one year at the University of Calabar studying remedial studies and then majored in Medical Microbiology at the School of Medical Lab Science afterward, LUTH (Lagos University Teaching Hospital) in Lagos. Henshaw worked at the Bauchi State General hospital. 
Before becoming an actress, Henshaw worked as a model, featuring in various commercials including a print and television advert for Shield deodorant.

Career
In 1993, Henshaw auditioned for the lead role in the movie When the Sun Sets and was chosen for the role. This was her first appearance in a major Nollywood movie. Henshaw has starred in over 45 Nollywood movies.

In 2008, she won the Africa Movie Academy Award for Best Actress in a Leading Role for the film Stronger than Pain.

She was nominated for "Best Actress in a Leading Role" at the African Movie Academy Award in 2018, for her performance in the movie "Roti".

Politics

On 19 July 2014, Henshaw officially unveiled her campaign website as she was aspiring to represent the Calabar Municipal/Odukpani Federal constituency under the platform of the Peoples Democratic Party. Henshaw lost the primary election to Rt. Hon Essien Ayi but was appointed as Special Adviser Liaison Lagos by the Cross River State Governor Ben Ayade in December 2015.

Endorsement

In 2012, Henshaw was made the brand ambassador for a UK perfumes line, Blessing perfumes. She is a brand ambassador for "Onga" seasoning produced by Promasidor Nigeria Limited. In September 2012, Henshaw along with Dan Foster was selected as a judge in the reality show Nigeria Got Talent. In 2013, Henshaw along with Banky W was made the brand ambassador for Samsung Mobile Division. In January 2019, Kate Henshaw was selected to be among the 50 judges that will take part in the CBS International Talent Show called The World's Best. Henshaw was an ambassador for the giant telecommunication company Glo.

Philanthropy

In 2016, a Twitter user posted the picture of a two-year-old boy, Michael Alvez, who was born with an ulcerous growth in the face and tagged Henshaw who subsequently developed an interest in the case. She and several others contributed the sum of 8 million Naira for the boy for his treatment. However, the money was returned as per the family's request, who rejected all help.

Personal life 
Henshaw married British-born Roderick James Nuttal in 1999, and they have a child together. Henshaw and Nuttal divorced in 2011.

Honors 
In 2011, Henshaw was honored by the Nigerian federal government as a Member of the Order of the Federal Republic (MFR).

Awards and nominations

Filmography 

Above Death: In God We Trust (2003)
A Million Tears (2006)
My Little Secret (2006)
Stronger Than Pain (2007)
Show Me Heaven (2007)
Aremu The Principal (2015)
Chief Daddy (2018) 
New Money (2018) 
The Ghost and the House of Truth (2019)
4th Republic (2019)
The Women (2018)
Blood Sisters  (2022)

References

External links

 
 Official website

1971 births
Living people
Lagos University Teaching Hospital alumni
Best Actress Africa Movie Academy Award winners
Actresses from Cross River State
20th-century Nigerian actresses
21st-century Nigerian actresses
Nigerian actor-politicians
Nigerian actresses
University of Calabar alumni
Members of the Order of the Federal Republic